Franklin is a town in Franklin County, Vermont, United States. The population was 1,363 at the 2020 census. The original name was "Huntsburgh", but the name was changed to "Franklin" in 1817.

Geography
Franklin is located along the northern border of Franklin County, which also is the northern border of Vermont and the Canada–United States border. The main community in town is the hamlet of Franklin near the town center, while East Franklin is on the town's eastern border. Vermont Route 120 passes through the town center, leading south to North Sheldon and east to East Franklin. Vermont Route 235 runs northwest from the center of Franklin to Morses Line at the Canadian border. Vermont Route 236 runs through the eastern part of town, north to East Franklin and south to South Franklin, which however is located in the neighboring town of Sheldon.

Lake Carmi occupies the eastern part of the town, with Lake Carmi State Park on the southeast shore. The lake drains from its northeast end to the Pike River, which flows north and west through Quebec to Missisquoi Bay on Lake Champlain. The Rock River flows through the western part of the town, also to Missisquoi Bay.

Demographics

As of the census of 2000, there were 1,268 people, 429 households, and 343 families residing in the town.  The population density was 32.8 people per square mile (12.7/km2).  There were 736 housing units at an average density of 19.1 per square mile (7.4/km2).  The racial makeup of the town was 96.29% White, 0.16% African American, 1.81% Native American, 0.24% Asian, 0.08% Pacific Islander, and 1.42% from two or more races. Hispanic or Latino of any race were 0.08% of the population.

There were 429 households, out of which 42.0% had children under the age of 18 living with them, 66.4% were married couples living together, 8.2% had a female householder with no husband present, and 20.0% were non-families. 15.2% of all households were made up of individuals, and 4.7% had someone living alone who was 65 years of age or older.  The average household size was 2.90 and the average family size was 3.17.

In the town, the population was spread out, with 29.6% under the age of 18, 6.4% from 18 to 24, 30.5% from 25 to 44, 22.4% from 45 to 64, and 11.1% who were 65 years of age or older.  The median age was 36 years. For every 100 females, there were 101.9 males.  For every 100 females age 18 and over, there were 101.6 males.

The median income for a household in the town was $39,926, and the median income for a family was $40,156. Males had a median income of $27,589 versus $21,776 for females. The per capita income for the town was $17,222.  About 3.7% of families and 5.5% of the population were below the poverty line, including 5.8% of those under age 18 and 5.3% of those age 65 or over.

Notable people 

 Havilah Babcock, Wisconsin businessman
 Orville E. Babcock, Civil War era general and private secretary under President Grant
 Moses Ransom Doyon, mayor of Madison, Wisconsin
 Charles W. Gates, 55th governor of Vermont
 Lemuel Roberts, Revolutionary War soldier and author
 Seth Wakeman, former US congressman

Trivia
 In the film Morning Glory (1933), Katharine Hepburn's character says she has come to New York City from Franklin, VT to seek her fortune on Broadway.

References

External links
 
 Town of Franklin, Vermont official website

 
Towns in Vermont
Burlington, Vermont metropolitan area
Towns in Franklin County, Vermont